The Reimann School of Art and Design was a private art school which was founded in Berlin in 1902 by Albert Reimann, and re-established in Regency Street, Pimlico, London in January 1937 after persecution by the Nazis. It was the first commercial art school in Britain.

The school closed at the outbreak of World War II and its premises were subsequently destroyed by bombing.

Notable staff 

Staff in Berlin included Walter Peterhans, Werner Graeff.

In London, (Florence) Louise Clarke Aldred (1910–1997) was head of textiles from 1939. Stanley Herbert taught poster design and another poster designer, Austin Cooper, was principal. Other staff included Walter Nurnberg (a student from the Berlin school), Richard Hamilton, Leonard Rosoman, Eric Fraser, Milner Gray and Merlyn Evans.

Alumni

The school's alumni included :

Berlin 

 Jacqueline Diffring
Natasha Kroll
 Elisabeth Meyer
 Walter Nurnberg
 Alma Siedhoff-Buscher
 Henry Talbot
 Mauricio Amster

London 

 Bruce Angrave
 Agatha Christie
 Dorrit Dekk 
 Eileen Evans
 Richard Hamilton
 Anneliese Juda
 Jon Miller
 Hans Arnold Rothholz
 Iris Birtwistle
 Marianne Steiner (nee Esberg)

Further reading 

  2009, .
 The Reimann School: A Design Diaspora Yasuku Suga, Artmonsky Arts (2014) 
 Reimann, Albert. “Die Reimann-Schule in Berlin”. Verlag Bruno Hessling, Berlin 1966. Hard Cover, 106 p.

References 

1902 establishments in Germany
Art schools in Germany
Art schools in London